Rudravarman, was the last king of Funan.

Biography 
Rudravarman was the last king of Funan, as mentioned by the Chinese annals. He was the eldest son of Jayavarman Kaundinya and was born of a concubine. After the death of his father, he murdered the legitimate heir, his half-brother Gunavarman, and seized the throne in the year 514. Until at least 517 he was involved in a power struggle with his step mother, Queen Kulaprabhavati, who was supported by his opponents.

He subsequently sent embassies in China in the years 517, 519, 520, 530, 535 and 539. He even proposed to give a hair of the Buddha to the Emperor of China, if the sovereign agreed to send the monk Che Yun Pao to Funan.

References

Sources
Bruno Dagens, Khmer, publishing company Les Belles Lettres, January 2003, 335  p., chap.  I ("The Khmer Country, History"), p. 24-25
(in) George Cœdès and Walter F. Vella ( eds. ) ( Trans.  From French by Susan Brown Cowing) The Indianized States of Southeast Asia, University of Hawaii Press, May 1970, 424  p., p. 56-60
Paul Pelliot, "  The Funan  ," Bulletin of the French School of the Far East, vol.  3, n o  1,1903, p. 270-271 ( ISSN  1760-737X, DOI  10.3406 / befeo.1903.1216 )

Cambodian monarchs
6th-century Cambodian monarchs
Funan